Fave TV is an American digital multicast television network owned by the CBS Entertainment Group, a subsidiary of Paramount Global. The channel soft-launched in the markets covered by CBS Television Stations on December 15, 2020, usually as a DT4 subchannel.

Programming 
The network's programming is mostly taken from the program archives of Paramount Global's non-children's networks, along with carrying repeat syndicated sitcoms which are available through PG's cable networks. The network also carries overnight paid programming.

Affiliates

Current

Former

References 

Paramount Global
Television channels and stations established in 2020
2020 establishments in the United States